Glomfjord Church is a parish church of the Church of Norway in Meløy Municipality in Nordland county, Norway. It is located in the village of Glomfjord. It is the church for the Glomfjord parish which is part of the Bodø domprosti (deanery) in the Diocese of Sør-Hålogaland. The white, plastered stone church was built in a long church style in 1957 using plans drawn up by the architects Gudolf Blakstad and Herman Munthe-Kaas. The church seats about 250 people.

See also
List of churches in Sør-Hålogaland

References

Meløy
Churches in Nordland
Stone churches in Norway
20th-century Church of Norway church buildings
Churches completed in 1957
1957 establishments in Norway
Long churches in Norway